Shoot 'Em Up is a 2007 American action thriller film written and directed by Michael Davis. It stars Clive Owen, Paul Giamatti, Monica Bellucci, and Stephen McHattie. The film follows Smith (Owen), a drifter who rescues a newborn from being killed by assassin Hertz (Giamatti) and his henchmen. Smith flees from the gang, enlisting the help of prostitute Donna Quintano (Bellucci) to keep the baby safe as he unravels the conspiracy.

According to Davis, the idea for the film came about after he saw a gun-battle scene from John Woo's critically acclaimed Hard Boiled in which Chow Yun-fat rescues newborn babies from gangsters. Desiring to make an action film centering on guns, he expanded the idea into a screenplay in 2000, accompanied by an animated footage with 17,000 drawings for the action scenes. After a deal with New Line Cinema, filming began in Toronto. The film was photographed by Hong Kong cinematographer Peter Pau.

Before its September 2007 release, the film was previewed at that year's San Diego Comic-Con and received a positive response. Despite a mediocre commercial performance (recouping less than its budget), critical reception to the film was largely favorable.

Plot
At a bus stop in a rough part of town, a carrot-eating drifter and military veteran named Smith sees a pregnant woman on the verge of giving birth while fleeing a hitman. Following them into a warehouse, Smith kills the hitman by stabbing him in the face with a carrot and retrieves the woman's pistol. As more thugs, led by a ruthless man named Hertz, arrive, the woman goes into labor and Smith delivers her baby boy during a shootout. Pursued by Hertz, the woman is shot dead; Smith narrowly escapes with the newborn. Leaving the baby in a park, Smith hopes someone will adopt the child, but a passing woman is killed with a shot from Hertz's sniper rifle. Realizing that Hertz is trying to kill the baby, Smith saves him and tries unsuccessfully to leave him with a prostitute named Donna Quintano. 

Hertz soon arrives at the brothel and tortures Donna for information; Smith returns and kills Hertz's henchmen. After a brief confrontation, Smith shoots Hertz and leaves with Donna and the baby. Having secretly worn a bulletproof vest, however, Hertz is alive albeit wounded. Taking Donna to his hideout, Smith realizes that the baby (whom he names Oliver) stops crying when he hears heavy metal music; he concludes that Oliver's mother lived near a heavy metal club. Pursued by Hertz, Smith shoots his way out of the hideout, and he and Donna head to a nearby club. Above the club they discover an apartment with medical equipment and two dead, pregnant women; Smith concludes that the women were all impregnated with one man's sperm in order to give birth to matching bone marrow donors. 

While they are having a chat in a motel room, Smith and Donna are attacked by masked men, where he notices that his assailants' weapons are Hammerson models, unavailable to the public. Smith brings Donna and Oliver to a war museum and hides them in a M24 Chaffee tank for safekeeping. Smith infiltrates the Hammerson factory and hears Hertz and Hammerson saying that they do not want the next president to repeal the right to bear arms. He also notices that Hammerson owns a German Shepherd dog named Duchess. Smith booby-traps the facility with an array of firearms, allowing him to kill the thugs and escape. During a shootout, Hertz reveals that he had conducted an investigation about Smith's identity and it turned out Smith is a former Army Ranger whose wife and kid were killed in a shootout in a burger joint. Smith sees an article about Senator Rutledge, a Democratic presidential candidate who favors stricter gun laws. Smith deduces that Rutledge has cancer and requires a bone-marrow transplant. 

Due to which, Rutledge had impregnated the woman with his sperm (and why Hertz and Hammerson want Oliver dead). If the infants die, the senator will not receive a transplant and would be unable to run for president. Smith tells Donna to leave town and contacts one of Rutledge's henchmen to request an appointment. Meeting on an airplane, the senator confirms Smith's suspicions and Smith notices dog hair on Rutledge's trousers. Deducing that the hair belongs to Duchess and that the senator made a deal with Hammerson, Smith takes Rutledge hostage. Hertz appears and reveals that he agreed to help Rutledge find a bone-marrow donor, on the condition that Rutledge protects Hertz's constitutional right to bear arms when elected president. Smith kills the senator, whose assassination he explains "will cause public outrage and trigger immense support" for his gun control proposals. 

Smith parachutes from the airplane and kills several pursuing henchmen, but is himself shot and collapses after he lands, where he awakens in Hammerson's mansion; Hertz tortures him, breaking his fingers in an attempt to learn where Smith sent Donna and Oliver. As Hertz prepares to cut Smith's eyes, Smith breaks free and kills Hammerson and several thugs. Cornered and struggling to use his gun, Smith places live bullets between his broken fingers and detonates them with a fireplace, critically wounding Hertz. As they grab pistols and struggle, Smith fires first and kills Hertz. Smith boards a bus with Duchess and stops at an ice-cream parlor where Donna works as a waitress while watching Oliver. Surprised to see each other alive, he and Donna kiss passionately. A group of amateur armed robbers suddenly enters the parlor; his hands in bandages, Smith shoots them by using a carrot to pull the trigger.

Cast

The protagonist, known only as Smith, is an homage to the Man with No Name of Sergio Leone's Spaghetti Westerns. Smith's misanthropy derived from writer-director Michael Davis' frustration when his 1989 script about Alfred Kinsey failed to materialize as a feature film. His research about Kinsey and human sexuality in general inspired the character of Donna Quintano, a gold-hearted prostitute and Smith's eventual love interest. Hertz, a former FBI profiler who lives a double life as an assassin and a family patriarch, pursues Smith. According to co-producer Susan Montford, the antagonist was modeled after the BTK Killer. Hertz's feud with Smith has been compared to that of Bugs Bunny and Elmer Fudd in Looney Tunes because Smith (like Bugs) spends considerable time eating carrots in the film. Davis acknowledged that the Looney Tunes reference was deliberate.

Production

Davis had wanted to make an action film which focused on guns and was devoid of explosions. He conceived the film after seeing a scene from John Woo's critically acclaimed action film Hard Boiled (1992), in which star Chow Yun-fat rescues newborn babies from gangsters while engaged in a gunfight. Davis felt that the scene could be expanded into a feature-length film, a "gun-like" version of Run Lola Run (1998). By 2000, Davis had begun writing the screenplay; when the script was finished, however, studios refused to get it made after the Columbine High School massacre happened, causing him to shelve the project and return to making low-budget independent films.

During his subsequent years as an independent filmmaker, Davis started putting together an animatic of the script's action scenes using a Wacom tablet and the iMovie app. The animatic, which he made originally as a hobby, became his pitch animation in finding a producer for the project. He sent the script to Don Murphy, a producer he went to film school with at the USC School of Cinematic Arts, and Murphy as well as co-producers Susan Montford and Rick Benattar enjoyed it. Murphy, Montford and Benattar also saw the film's potential as a big-budget production, so they sent the animatic to major film studio New Line Cinema. New Line executives Jeff Katz and Cale Boyter liked it and they passed it on to Toby Emmerich, who greenlit the project at the behest of New Line founder Bob Shaye.

Davis's first choice to play Smith was Clive Owen, who signed as the lead because the script impressed him. The role of Donna went to Monica Bellucci, who liked the script and the character: an independent woman who "does dangerous, dark dirty things in a playful way". The multilingual Bellucci dubbed herself in the film's French and Italian versions. Davis cast Paul Giamatti, who usually played "nice guy" roles, against type to avoid the stereotype of a physically imposing villain, and because he believed Giamatti could deliver the duality of the role.

Shoot 'Em Up was produced on a budget of $39 million. Principal photography took place in Toronto and lasted fifty-five days, with Hong Kong's Peter Pau serving as cinematographer. Before filming, Owen and Giamatti were trained in firearms. Although he found the stunts physically demanding, Owen resolved to perform most of them himself. In the skydiving scene, he was aided by a Cirque du Soleil safety harness. Eighty firearms were used during production, and $70,000 of the film's budget was allocated for 6,000 squibs.

Music
The score for Shoot 'Em Up was composed by Paul Haslinger and recorded at NRG Recording Studios in North Hollywood, California. It was released on CD and as a digital download on August 28, 2007, by Varèse Sarabande. A soundtrack album of nu metal and rock songs by various artists was made available on February 12, 2008.

Marketing

In July 2007, Shoot 'Em Up was publicized with a guerrilla marketing campaign by the London-based agency New Media Maze. The campaign included a viral video and a website selling bogus items ranging from bulletproof strollers to riot helmets for infants. A video was released on YouTube in which the company claimed to test the bulletproof stroller by shooting at it with a submachine gun while a baby was in it. The baby was then removed from the stroller unharmed. The hoax campaign was taken seriously by global media and the blogging community; Aftonbladet, Sweden's largest evening tabloid, carried the story on its online edition for some time.

In November 2007, two ads that showed Owen and Giamatti holding guns were banned in the United Kingdom by the Advertising Standards Authority (ASA) on the grounds that they had "glamorized and glorified gun crime" and "were offensive and insensitive toward families directly affected by gun crime". At the time of the ruling, it was also reported that gun violence in the UK was on the rise.

Release
Although Variety reported a planned release during the 2006 holiday season, Shoot 'Em Up was previewed in September of that year. The film was released in American theaters on September 7, 2007. It was released on the same day in Canada, opening on 235 screens against 3:10 to Yuma. Audience response to a screening at the 2007 San Diego Comic-Con was positive.

Shoot 'Em Up opened in fourth place on its first weekend, earning $5,716,139 at 2,108 locations. Overall, the film grossed $12,807,139 over six weeks in North American theaters and $26,820,641 worldwide. It was regarded as a box-office failure, recouping less than its budget.

The film's DVD and Blu-ray versions were released in January 2008 by New Line Home Entertainment with a behind-the-scenes featurette titled "Ballet of Bullets", 17 minutes of animatics and audio commentary from director Michael Davis, trailers and deleted scenes. New Line released another DVD and Blu-ray of the film in a two-disc version in August 2011.

Critical response

Rotten Tomatoes gives the film an approval rating of 67%, with an average rating of 6.15/10, based on reviews from 161 critics. The website's "Critics Consensus" for the film reads, "As preposterous and over-the-top as Shoot 'Em Up may be, its humor and non-stop action make for a very enjoyable film." On Metacritic it has a weighted average score of 49 out of 100, based on reviews from 23 critics, indicating "mixed or average reviews". Audiences polled by CinemaScore during its opening weekend gave the film an average grade of "B−" on a scale ranging from A+ to F.

Peter Travers rated the film 3 out of 4 stars for Rolling Stone, calling it "eighty-two minutes of hardcore pow. [...] You'll be exhilarated – also exhausted." Roger Ebert for the Chicago Sun-Times scored the film 3 out of 4 stars, comparing it favorably with Sin City as "the most audacious, implausible, cheerfully offensive, hyperactive action picture [he had] seen". Frank Scheck in The Hollywood Reporter called it a "ramped-up action movie on steroids" that "makes Hard Boiled look restrained". Ebert extended his praise toward the film's acting, calling Owen's character sympathetic and Giamatti's "surprisingly, teeth-gnashingly evil". Scheck complimented Owen's "low-rent James Bond" performance, and was delighted to see Giamatti cast against his usual "nerdy" on-screen persona.

A. O. Scott gave the film a scathing review for The New York Times, calling it "a worthless piece of garbage" and that it was one of several "witless, soulless, heartless movies that mistake noise for bravura and tastelessness for wit". Stephen Hunter in The Washington Post said the film "is just gunfights strung together, without a whisper of coherence or meaning. The fights are staged so that they all look the same, and the principle is always the same: The gunman's multiple antagonists never hit, and he never misses." James Berardinelli gave the film a mixed review, saying that while it delivered gunfights as advertised, he complained that it "pretty much consists of shoot-outs and chases overtaking each other like waves rolling onto a beach, each more over-the-top than its predecessor". Berardinelli scored the film 2 out of 4 stars, writing that he "like[d] the audacity and its willingness to push the envelope beyond the limits of good taste. In the end, it's a little too long and uneven to recommend outright, but [he] won't deny having enjoyed aspects of what Davis is offering."

In 2016, Shoot 'Em Up made the list of "25 great action films that are 90 minutes or under" compiled by Nick Horton of Den of Geek. Rotten Tomatoes ranked Shoot 'Em Up at  111 on its list of the "140 Essential Actions Movies To Watch".

References

External links

 
 
 

2007 action films
2007 films
American action thriller films
Films about babies
Films directed by Michael Davis
Films shot in Toronto
Films scored by Paul Haslinger
New Line Cinema films
Films produced by Don Murphy
2000s English-language films
2000s American films